The National Institute for Agrarian Reform (INRA) was an agency of the Cuban Government that was formed to institute the Agrarian Reform Law of 1959.

INRA also implemented the Second Agrarian Reform Law of 1963. It oversaw the development of the rural infrastructure.

Che Guevara was appointed the first leader of the Institute.

See also
Agriculture in Cuba
Agrarian Reform Laws of Cuba

Agricultural organizations based in Cuba
Agricultural research
Che Guevara
Land reform
1959 establishments in Cuba
Research institutes established in 1959